2007 World Junior Championships may refer to:

 Figure skating: 2007 World Junior Figure Skating Championships
 Ice hockey: 2007 World Junior Ice Hockey Championships
 Motorcycle speedway:
 2007 Individual Speedway Junior World Championship
 2007 Team Speedway Junior World Championship

See also
 2007 World Cup (disambiguation)
 2007 Continental Championships (disambiguation)
 2007 World Championships (disambiguation)